PDCurses is a public domain software programming library for DOS, OS/2, Windows, X11 and SDL2. It is a continuation of the original curses system - while development of curses ended in the mid-1990s, work on ncurses and PDCurses continued. PDCurses implements most of the functions available in the original X/Open and UNIX System V R4 curses. Development started in 1987 to support The Hessling Editor. It supports many compilers for these platforms. The X11 port lets one recompile existing text-mode curses programs to produce native X11 applications.

External links
 PDCurses on GitHub
 

Curses (programming library)
Public-domain software with source code